Attleborough is a town in Norfolk, England.

Attleborough or Attleboro may also refer to:

 Attleborough, Warwickshire, England
 Attleboro, Massachusetts, USA
Attleboro station (disambiguation), stations of the name

See also
 North Attleborough, Massachusetts
 South Attleboro, Massachusetts